Conus fuscolineatus is a species of sea snail, a marine gastropod mollusk in the family Conidae, the cone snails and their allies.

Like all species within the genus Conus, these snails are predatory and venomous. They are capable of "stinging" humans, therefore live ones should be handled carefully or not at all.

Description
The size of an adult shell varies between 15 mm and 40 mm.

Distribution
This species occurs in the Eastern Atlantic Ocean from Guinee to Angola, and in the Mediterranean Sea.

References

  Sowerby, G. B., III. 1905. Descriptions of seven new species of marine Mollusca from the collection of the late Admiral Keppel. Proceedings of the Malacological Society of London 6(5):279–282, figs. 5, 6
 Filmer R.M. (2001). A Catalogue of Nomenclature and Taxonomy in the Living Conidae 1758–1998. Backhuys Publishers, Leiden. 388pp.
 Tucker J.K. (2009). Recent cone species database. 4 September 2009 Edition

External links
 The Conus Biodiversity website
 Cone Shells – Knights of the Sea

Gallery

fuscolineatus
Gastropods described in 1905